{{DISPLAYTITLE:Xi1 Sagittarii}}

Xi1 Sagittarii (ξ1 Sagittarii) is a solitary, blue-white hued star in the zodiac constellation of Sagittarius. It is visible to the naked eye with an apparent visual magnitude of +5.06.  Based upon a small annual parallax shift of 1.58 mas as seen from Earth, this system is located roughly 2,100 light years from the Sun.

This is a massive supergiant star with a stellar classification of B9/A0 Ib. With an estimated 7.8 times the mass of the Sun and an age of about 40 million years it has depleted the hydrogen at its core, causing it to expand to about 15 times the Sun's radius. It is radiating 2,753 times the Sun's luminosity from its photosphere at an effective temperature of about 9,400 K.

References

B-type supergiants
Sagittarii, Xi
Sagittarius (constellation)
Durchmusterung objects
Sagittarii, 36
175687
093057
7145